Juan Jose Graterol Montevideo (pronounced GRAD-er-all; born February 14, 1989) is a Venezuelan professional baseball catcher who is currently a free agent. He has played in Major League Baseball (MLB) for the Los Angeles Angels, Minnesota Twins, and Cincinnati Reds. Graterol made his major league debut in 2016.

Early life
Graterol was born in Maracay, Venezuela.

Career

Kansas City Royals
Graterol was signed as an undrafted international free agent by scout Juan Indriago in 2005, and began his professional career in the Kansas City Royals organization. As a 17 year old for the Royals' Dominican League team, Graterol slashed .296/.386/.349. In 2007, playing for the rookie-ball Burlington Royals, Graterol's production tanked as he hit only .225/.292/.235, but bettered his production the next year playing for the Idaho Falls Chukars, as he batted .276/.366/.316. Graterol spent the majority of the next two season with the Single-A Burlington Bees, batting a solid .300/.343/.340. That season, he also made it as high as the advanced Single-A Wilmington Blue Rocks, only appearing in 3 games for the team. Through his first 4 years as a professional player, Graterol managed a .278/.349/.315 batting line with no home runs or triples, and only 21 doubles. In 2011, Graterol split the season between the Kane County Cougars and Wilmington, but his production hit a  wall as he batted only .195/.255/.235, however he did hit his first professional home run with Wilmington. In 2012, Graterol spent the entire season with Wilmington, with great production as he hit .301/.338/.393. On May 12, 2013, while playing for the Double-A Northwest Arkansas Naturals, Graterol hit the game-deciding home run in a 5-4 victory against the Springfield Cardinals in a game that had lasted 20 innings. The game, which lasted 5 hours and 38 minutes was the longest in Naturals history. He ended the season batting .286/.314/.368 with 3 home runs and 17 RBI. Graterol was invited to Spring Training with the Royals for the 2014 season. In 2014, Graterol reached Triple-A for the first time, appearing in 7 games for the Omaha Storm Chasers, but spent the majority of the season with Northwest Arkansas as he hit .278/.307/.387 between the two teams.

New York Yankees
On December 10, 2014, Graterol signed a minor league contract with the New York Yankees organization. Graterol split the season between the Single-A Charleston RiverDogs, the Double-A Trenton Thunder, and the Triple-A Scranton/Wilkes-Barre RailRiders, hitting a meager .198/.235/.250 between the three teams. He became a free agent on November 6, 2015.

Los Angeles Angels
He signed with the Los Angeles Angels of Anaheim on January 12, 2016, and was promoted to the major leagues for the first time on July 18, 2016. After Graterol was with the Angels for five days he was optioned to the minor leagues, without having appeared in a game. Graterol was called up and made his major league debut on September 2, 2016, and had 14 major league at bats in the season. He was designated for assignment by the Angels on November 22.

Cincinnati Reds
On November 28, 2016, the Cincinnati Reds claimed Graterol off waivers. He was designated for assignment by the Reds in December.

Arizona Diamondbacks
He was claimed off waivers by the Arizona Diamondbacks on December 24, 2016. They designated Graterol for assignment on January 13, 2017, after signing Chris Iannetta.

Second stint with Angels
The Angels claimed Graterol off waivers on January 19, 2017. The Angels then waived Graterol again.

Toronto Blue Jays
The Toronto Blue Jays claimed him off waivers on January 23, 2017. Graterol was designated for assignment on April 14.

Third stint with Angels
On April 18, 2017, Graterol was traded by the Blue Jays back to the Angels in exchange for cash or a player to be named later. In 2017 he batted .202/.207/.250 with no home runs and 10 RBIs in 84 at bats.

He was designated for assignment on April 4, 2018. He was outrighted to the Salt Lake Bees on May 8. He was designated for assignment on June 19, and released on June 24.

Minnesota Twins
On June 28, 2018, Graterol signed a minor league deal with the Minnesota Twins as a free agent. In the majors with the Twins, he batted .143/.250/.143 in seven at bats.

Second stint with Reds
On October 10, 2018, Graterol was claimed off waivers by the Reds. He was non-tendered on November 30, and became a free agent. On December 3, 2018, Graterol re-signed a minor league deal with the Reds. He was called up to the major leagues on July 17, 2019. On October 16, Graterol was designated for assignment. He elected free agency on October 21.

Second Stint with Twins
On November 26, 2019, Graterol signed a minor league contract with the Minnesota Twins. He became a free agent on November 2, 2020.

Fourth Stint with Angels
On December 30, 2020, Graterol signed a minor league contract with the Los Angeles Angels organization.

Second Stint with Blue Jays
On  March, 31, 2021, Graterol was traded to the Toronto Blue Jays in exchange for cash considerations and assigned to Triple-A Buffalo on May 3, 2021.

Second Stint with Diamondbacks
On November 13, 2021, Graterol signed a minor league contract with the Arizona Diamondbacks. He was released on August 1, 2022.

See also
 List of Major League Baseball players from Venezuela

References

External links

1989 births
Living people
Águilas del Zulia players
Buffalo Bisons (minor league) players
Burlington Bees players
Burlington Royals players
Charleston RiverDogs players
Cincinnati Reds players
Dominican Summer League Royals players
Idaho Falls Chukars players
Kane County Cougars players
Los Angeles Angels players
Louisville Bats players
Major League Baseball catchers
Major League Baseball players from Venezuela
Minnesota Twins players
Northwest Arkansas Naturals players
Sportspeople from Maracay
Omaha Storm Chasers players
Rochester Red Wings players
Salt Lake Bees players
Scranton/Wilkes-Barre RailRiders players
Tiburones de La Guaira players
Tigres de Aragua players
Trenton Thunder players
Venezuelan expatriate baseball players in the United States
Wilmington Blue Rocks players
Venezuelan expatriate baseball players in the Dominican Republic